Threat Matrix is an American drama television series created by Daniel Voll that aired on ABC from September 18, 2003 to January 29, 2004 which lasted 16 episodes.  The plot consisted of the events in a United States Homeland Security anti-terrorism unit, led by Special agent John Kilmer.

The title of the show refers to a report given to the President of the United States each morning, which contains information relating to the latest threats against the security of the United States.

Cast
 James Denton as Special Agent John Kilmer, a former Delta Force operator.
 Kelly Rutherford as Special Agent Frankie Ellroy-Kilmer
 Will Lyman as Colonel Roger Atkins
 Anthony Azizi as Mohammad "Mo" Hassain
 Kurt Caceres as Tim Vargas
 Mahershala Ali as Jelani Harper
 Melora Walters as Lia "Lark" Larkin
 Shoshannah Stern as Holly Brodeen
 Kelly Hu as Agent Mia Chen
 Steven Petrarca as Agent Adam Anders
 Lorraine Toussaint as Carina Wright

Episodes
A total of sixteen episodes were filmed; however, only fourteen were broadcast in the United States.

International Airings
 : SAT.1
 : Living TV
 : FX
 : TF1
 : Seven Network and Fox8
 : TV 2 (New Zealand)
 : Veronica
 : RTÉ Two
 : TV Norge
 : TV 3
 : Nova TV
 : Kanal 5 (Sweden)
 : TVP2
 : Channel One Russia
 : SBS Net
 : RTL Klub
 : RTS 1

External links
 
 

American Broadcasting Company original programming
2000s American drama television series
2003 American television series debuts
2004 American television series endings
Espionage television series
Television series by ABC Studios
American spy thriller television series
United States Department of Homeland Security